Dimitris (Mimis) Androulakis (born 24 November 1951 in Agios Nikolaos, Crete) is a Greek author and politician.

He was elected MP:
 With SYN in 1989
 With PASOK in 2004 by the Statewide list, in 2007, 2009 and 2012 for Athens B constituency

As a student in the National Technical University of Athens, he was actively involved in the antidictatorial struggle and took part in the Athens Technical University uprising as a member of the organizational students' committee.

He was deputy member of the Central Committee of the Communist Party of Greece until 1991 when he resigned to join Synaspismos. He stopped his active involvement in politics in 1993 and appeared again in 2004 after accepting George Papandreou's offer to join PASOK's lists.

He has written 11 novels and many political books. His book Mν (in Greek read as "mi eis ti(n) ni" alluding to the word "mouni" -"pussy" in Greek) which portrays Jesus Christ as a philanderer who finds it hard to resist Mary Magdalene triggered the Greek Orthodox Church's reactions and several copies of the book were set on fire in Thessaloniki by Christians who found the book's contents offensive.

References

External links
Personal homepage

1951 births
Living people
People from Agios Nikolaos, Crete
Politicians from Crete
Greek MPs 1989–1990
Greek MPs 2004–2007
Greek MPs 2007–2009
Greek MPs 2009–2012
Greek writers
Coalition of Left, of Movements and Ecology politicians
Communist Party of Greece politicians
PASOK politicians
National Technical University of Athens alumni
Greek MPs 2012 (May)
Greek MPs 2012–2014
Writers from Crete
Critics of Christianity
Greek atheists